General Tawfik Mohammed Hussein al-Tirawi is a Fatah official who led the investigation into the death of former President Yasser Arafat. He served as the head of Palestinian Authority Intelligence in the West Bank from 1994 to 2008.

Tirawi, the head of Fatah's Commission for Intellectual Mobilization and Studies, was elected to the Central Committee at the sixth Fatah convention in 2009.

Early life
Tawfik Tirawi was born in Tira on 15 November 1948. His family fled to Rantis in 1948. He completed his primary schooling in Ramallah before going to Iskaka village in Salfit and then to Jabr refugee camp in Jericho where he attended junior high and high school. He received a diploma from Ibrahimeya college in Jerusalem. He graduated from Beirut Arab University with a degree in Arabic literature. He earned another degree in philosophy and psychology. He earned a master's degree in educational administration from An-Najah National University in 2008. His thesis was 'The Reality of Crises and Proposed Alternatives to Manage it From the Standpoint of Security and Civil Institutions' Leaders in Palestine'. He is preparing a doctoral thesis for the University of Tanta on 'The Role of the University Leadership in Promoting National Belonging'.

Political activism
He joined Fatah in 1967 while attending Beirut Arab University. He headed the Lebanese branch of the General Union of Palestinian Students from 1969 to 1971 and in 1970 he was head of the secret Student Office of the Secretariat of Fatah. In 1978 he became a member of the executive body of the General Union of Palestinian Students and a member of the Palestinian National Council. The Syrian security services arrested him on 23 July 1985. He was tortured for four days by the intelligence services and then kept in solitary confinement for months. He was imprisoned in various locations in Syria until his release on 2 November 1989.

Intelligence
He helped create the Palestinian General Intelligence Service on 7 June 1994. Years later, he stayed with Arafat when his compound came under Israeli siege. President Mahmoud Abbas appointed Tirawi his security adviser as well as head of the Palestinian General Intelligence on 28 August 2007. He served as intelligence head until 21 November 2008 and security adviser until he was elected to the Central Committee of Fatah on 8 December 2009. He served as general of the Popular Organizations commissioner of Fatah from 2009 to 2011. In 2013, he became the general intellectual mobilization and studies commissioner.

He is the Chairman of the Board of Trustees of Al-Istiqlal University in Jericho.

References

External links
Official website

1948 births
Fatah military commanders
Living people
Ibrahimieh College alumni
Central Committee of Fatah members
An-Najah National University alumni